A Real Vermeer is a 2016 Dutch biographical film about art forger Han van Meegeren directed by Rudolf van den Berg. It was listed as one of eleven films that could be selected as the Dutch submission for the Best Foreign Language Film at the 89th Academy Awards, but it was not nominated.

Cast
 Jeroen Spitzenberger as Han van Meegeren
 Lize Feryn as Jolanka Lakatos
  as Theo van der Pas
  as Abraham Bredius
 Dewi Reijs as Anna van Meegeren
  as Jac van Meegeren
 Raymond Thiry as Prosecutor
 Claude Humbert as Hermann Göring

References

External links
 

2016 films
2016 drama films
2016 biographical drama films
Dutch biographical drama films
2010s Dutch-language films